Articles by American writer John Neal (1793–1876) influenced the development of American literature towards cultural independence and a unique style. They were published in newspapers, magazines, and literary journals and are part of his bibliography. They include his first known published work and pieces published in the last decade of his life. The topics of these works reflect the Neal's broad interests, including women's rights, feminism, gender, race, slavery, children, education, law, politics, art, architecture, literature, drama, religion, gymnastics, civics, American history, science, phrenology, travel, language, political economy, and temperance.

Neal was one of the leading critics of his time, demonstrating distrust of institutions and an affinity for self-examination and self-reliance. Compared to Neal's lesser success in creative works, literary historian Fred Lewis Pattee found that "his critical judgments have held. Where he condemned, time has almost without exception condemned also." Editors of newspapers, magazines, and annual publications sought contributions from Neal on a wide variety of topics, particularly in the second half of the 1830s. His early articles make him one of the first male advocates of women's rights and feminist causes in the United States.

Neal was the first American to be published in any British literary magazine and in that capacity wrote the first history of American literature. His early encouragement of writers John Greenleaf Whittier, Edgar Allan Poe, Henry Wadsworth Longfellow, Elizabeth Oakes Smith, Nathaniel Hawthorne, and many others, helped launch their careers. Neal was the first American art critic, and his essays from the 1820s were recognized as "prophetic" by art historian Harold E. Dickson. As an early and outspoken theater critic, he drafted a future for American drama that was only partially realized sixty years later.

Articles

References

Citations

Sources

 
 
 
 
 
 
  In .
  In .
 
 
 
 
 
  In .
 
 
 
 
 
  In .

External links

 John Neal at Library of Congress Authorities
 
 Works by John Neal at Open Library
 Works by John Neal on the Online Books Page of the University of Pennsylvania Library

Bibliographies by writer
Bibliographies of American writers